Elizabeth Josephine "Liz" O'Neill  (19 March 19697 March 2007) was an Australian public servant and diplomat.

She was Counsellor (Public Affairs) for the Public Affairs section of the Australian Embassy in Jakarta at the time of her death. in service of the Department of Foreign Affairs and Trade. She was killed on 7 March 2007 in the crash of Garuda Indonesia Flight 200 in Yogyakarta, Indonesia. The Elizabeth O'Neill Journalism Award is given annually in her honour.

Honours
O'Neill was awarded a Medal of the Order of Australia in October 2003 for her service as a member of the Department of Foreign Affairs and Trade, Bali crisis taskforce through liaison with the media following the bombings which occurred in Bali on 12 October 2002.

References 

Australian public servants
Victims of aviation accidents or incidents in Indonesia
1969 births
2007 deaths
University of Sydney alumni
Recipients of the Medal of the Order of Australia
Victims of aviation accidents or incidents in 2007